The 1980–81 Philadelphia Flyers season was the Flyers' 14th season in the National Hockey League (NHL). After finishing second in the Patrick Division, the Flyers lost in the quarterfinals to the Calgary Flames in seven games.

Regular season 
Bobby Clarke wore the number 16 throughout his entire NHL career except for two games during the 1980–81 season. Prior to a road game on February 27, 1981, Clarke's jersey was stolen. Clarke wore the only other jersey available, number 36, in the next two games. A month later, Clarke hit a personal milestone in memorable fashion. On March 19 during a game against the Boston Bruins, a Reggie Leach slapshot struck Clarke. After leaving the ice, he re-appeared moments later stitched up and with his jersey covered in blood. 31 seconds into the third period Clarke beat Bruins goalie Marco Baron for his 19th goal of the season and his 1,000th career point.

Season standings

Playoffs
After a tough, five-game preliminary round series win against the Quebec Nordiques, the Flyers moved on to face the Calgary Flames in the quarterfinals. After falling behind 3 games to 1, they managed to force a Game 7 by winning the next two games. The Flyers lost Game 7, 4–1, at the Spectrum.

Schedule and results

Regular season

|- style="background:#cfc;"
| 1 || October 9 || Pittsburgh Penguins || 7–4 || 1–0–0 || 2 || 
|- style="background:#cfc;"
| 2 || October 11 || @ St. Louis Blues || 5–1 || 2–0–0 || 4 || 
|- style="background:#fcf;"
| 3 || October 12 || Toronto Maple Leafs || 2–4 || 2–1–0 || 4 || 
|- style="background:#fcf;"
| 4 || October 16 || Vancouver Canucks || 2–5 || 2–2–0 || 4 || 
|- style="background:#fcf;"
| 5 || October 18 || @ Toronto Maple Leafs || 2–6 || 2–3–0 || 4 || 
|- style="background:#cfc;"
| 6 || October 19 || Montreal Canadiens || 2–1 || 3–3–0 || 6 || 
|- style="background:#cfc;"
| 7 || October 23 || New York Islanders || 4–2 || 4–3–0 || 8 || 
|- style="background:#cfc;"
| 8 || October 25 || @ New York Islanders || 3–1 || 5–3–0 || 10 || 
|- style="background:#cfc;"
| 9 || October 26 || Hartford Whalers || 6–1 || 6–3–0 || 12 || 
|- style="background:#cfc;"
| 10 || October 28 || Calgary Flames || 8–0 || 7–3–0 || 14 || 
|- style="background:#ffc;"
| 11 || October 30 || New York Rangers || 3–3 || 7–3–1 || 15 || 
|-

|- style="background:#ffc;"
| 12 || November 1 || @ Quebec Nordiques || 3–3 || 7–3–2 || 16 || 
|- style="background:#cfc;"
| 13 || November 2 || Boston Bruins || 4–2 || 8–3–2 || 18 || 
|- style="background:#cfc;"
| 14 || November 6 || Los Angeles Kings || 8–2 || 9–3–2 || 20 || 
|- style="background:#cfc;"
| 15 || November 8 || @ Hartford Whalers || 5–4 || 10–3–2 || 22 || 
|- style="background:#cfc;"
| 16 || November 9 || Quebec Nordiques || 3–1 || 11–3–2 || 24 || 
|- style="background:#cfc;"
| 17 || November 13 || Edmonton Oilers || 8–1 || 12–3–2 || 26 || 
|- style="background:#cfc;"
| 18 || November 15 || Detroit Red Wings || 5–2 || 13–3–2 || 28 || 
|- style="background:#fcf;"
| 19 || November 16 || @ Boston Bruins || 0–1 || 13–4–2 || 28 || 
|- style="background:#cfc;"
| 20 || November 19 || @ New York Rangers || 5–1 || 14–4–2 || 30 || 
|- style="background:#ffc;"
| 21 || November 20 || Minnesota North Stars || 1–1 || 14–4–3 || 31 || 
|- style="background:#fcf;"
| 22 || November 22 || @ Montreal Canadiens || 3–7 || 14–5–3 || 31 || 
|- style="background:#cfc;"
| 23 || November 23 || Winnipeg Jets || 3–1 || 15–5–3 || 33 || 
|- style="background:#cfc;"
| 24 || November 26 || @ Los Angeles Kings || 4–2 || 16–5–3 || 35 || 
|- style="background:#cfc;"
| 25 || November 28 || @ Colorado Rockies || 7–4 || 17–5–3 || 37 || 
|- style="background:#ffc;"
| 26 || November 29 || @ Vancouver Canucks || 3–3 || 17–5–4 || 38 || 
|-

|- style="background:#cfc;"
| 27 || December 4 || Chicago Black Hawks || 7–5 || 18–5–4 || 40 || 
|- style="background:#fcf;"
| 28 || December 6 || @ Detroit Red Wings || 2–4 || 18–6–4 || 40 || 
|- style="background:#cfc;"
| 29 || December 7 || Colorado Rockies || 4–2 || 19–6–4 || 42 || 
|- style="background:#ffc;"
| 30 || December 10 || @ Chicago Black Hawks || 2–2 || 19–6–5 || 43 || 
|- style="background:#cfc;"
| 31 || December 13 || @ Pittsburgh Penguins || 6–5 || 20–6–5 || 45 || 
|- style="background:#cfc;"
| 32 || December 14 || St. Louis Blues || 5–4 || 21–6–5 || 47 || 
|- style="background:#cfc;"
| 33 || December 18 || Colorado Rockies || 2–0 || 22–6–5 || 49 || 
|- style="background:#cfc;"
| 34 || December 20 || @ Washington Capitals || 5–2 || 23–6–5 || 51 || 
|- style="background:#fcf;"
| 35 || December 21 || Washington Capitals || 0–6 || 23–7–5 || 51 || 
|- style="background:#fcf;"
| 36 || December 27 || @ Calgary Flames || 1–2 || 23–8–5 || 51 || 
|- style="background:#cfc;"
| 37 || December 28 || @ Edmonton Oilers || 2–1 || 24–8–5 || 53 || 
|- style="background:#fcf;"
| 38 || December 30 || @ Minnesota North Stars || 5–6 || 24–9–5 || 53 || 
|-

|- style="background:#fcf;"
| 39 || January 2 || @ Winnipeg Jets || 3–4 || 24–10–5 || 53 || 
|- style="background:#cfc;"
| 40 || January 4 || @ Washington Capitals || 8–1 || 25–10–5 || 55 || 
|- style="background:#ffc;"
| 41 || January 8 || St. Louis Blues || 5–5 || 25–10–6 || 56 || 
|- style="background:#ffc;"
| 42 || January 10 || @ Toronto Maple Leafs || 4–4 || 25–10–7 || 57 || 
|- style="background:#fcf;"
| 43 || January 11 || New York Islanders || 2–4 || 25–11–7 || 57 || 
|- style="background:#fcf;"
| 44 || January 15 || Quebec Nordiques || 1–4 || 25–12–7 || 57 || 
|- style="background:#fcf;"
| 45 || January 17 || @ Boston Bruins || 4–6 || 25–13–7 || 57 || 
|- style="background:#cfc;"
| 46 || January 18 || Los Angeles Kings || 7–2 || 26–13–7 || 59 || 
|- style="background:#cfc;"
| 47 || January 21 || @ Pittsburgh Penguins || 5–0 || 27–13–7 || 61 || 
|- style="background:#cfc;"
| 48 || January 22 || Minnesota North Stars || 5–4 || 28–13–7 || 63 || 
|- style="background:#fcf;"
| 49 || January 24 || @ Montreal Canadiens || 3–6 || 28–14–7 || 63 || 
|- style="background:#ffc;"
| 50 || January 28 || @ Buffalo Sabres || 4–4 || 28–14–8 || 64 || 
|- style="background:#cfc;"
| 51 || January 30 || @ Colorado Rockies || 7–4 || 29–14–8 || 66 || 
|- style="background:#cfc;"
| 52 || January 31 || @ St. Louis Blues || 3–2 || 30–14–8 || 68 || 
|-

|- style="background:#fcf;"
| 53 || February 5 || Buffalo Sabres || 0–4 || 30–15–8 || 68 || 
|- style="background:#fcf;"
| 54 || February 7 || @ Quebec Nordiques || 3–5 || 30–16–8 || 68 || 
|- style="background:#ffc;"
| 55 || February 8 || Hartford Whalers || 6–6 || 30–16–9 || 69 || 
|- style="background:#cfc;"
| 56 || February 12 || Vancouver Canucks || 4–3 || 31–16–9 || 71 || 
|- style="background:#cfc;"
| 57 || February 14 || @ Detroit Red Wings || 3–1 || 32–16–9 || 73 || 
|- style="background:#ffc;"
| 58 || February 15 || Montreal Canadiens || 5–5 || 32–16–10 || 74 || 
|- style="background:#cfc;"
| 59 || February 17 || Pittsburgh Penguins || 4–1 || 33–16–10 || 76 || 
|- style="background:#fcf;"
| 60 || February 19 || @ Calgary Flames || 4–5 || 33–17–10 || 76 || 
|- style="background:#cfc;"
| 61 || February 21 || @ Los Angeles Kings || 3–1 || 34–17–10 || 78 || 
|- style="background:#fcf;"
| 62 || February 24 || @ Vancouver Canucks || 4–6 || 34–18–10 || 78 || 
|- style="background:#fcf;"
| 63 || February 25 || @ Edmonton Oilers || 2–6 || 34–19–10 || 78 || 
|- style="background:#cfc;"
| 64 || February 27 || @ Winnipeg Jets || 6–3 || 35–19–10 || 80 || 
|- style="background:#cfc;"
| 65 || February 28 || @ Minnesota North Stars || 4–2 || 36–19–10 || 82 || 
|-

|- style="background:#cfc;"
| 66 || March 5 || Winnipeg Jets || 10–1 || 37–19–10 || 84 || 
|- style="background:#fcf;"
| 67 || March 7 || Edmonton Oilers || 3–5 || 37–20–10 || 84 || 
|- style="background:#fcf;"
| 68 || March 8 || @ Buffalo Sabres || 4–8 || 37–21–10 || 84 || 
|- style="background:#cfc;"
| 69 || March 12 || Detroit Red Wings || 9–4 || 38–21–10 || 86 || 
|- style="background:#ffc;"
| 70 || March 14 || @ New York Islanders || 3–3 || 38–21–11 || 87 || 
|- style="background:#ffc;"
| 71 || March 15 || Toronto Maple Leafs || 4–4 || 38–21–12 || 88 || 
|- style="background:#fcf;"
| 72 || March 18 || @ Chicago Black Hawks || 1–5 || 38–22–12 || 88 || 
|- style="background:#cfc;"
| 73 || March 19 || Boston Bruins || 5–3 || 39–22–12 || 90 || 
|- style="background:#ffc;"
| 74 || March 21 || Chicago Black Hawks || 4–4 || 39–22–13 || 91 || 
|- style="background:#cfc;"
| 75 || March 22 || Calgary Flames || 6–2 || 40–22–13 || 93 || 
|- style="background:#fcf;"
| 76 || March 24 || Washington Capitals || 2–5 || 40–23–13 || 93 || 
|- style="background:#cfc;"
| 77 || March 29 || @ Hartford Whalers || 4–1 || 41–23–13 || 95 || 
|- style="background:#ffc;"
| 78 || March 30 || @ New York Rangers || 0–0 || 41–23–14 || 96 || 
|-

|- style="background:#ffc;"
| 79 || April 2 || Buffalo Sabres || 2–2 || 41–23–15 || 97 || 
|- style="background:#fcf;"
| 80 || April 5 || New York Rangers || 0–2 || 41–24–15 || 97 || 
|-

|-
| Legend:

Playoffs

|- style="background:#cfc;"
| 1 || April 8 || Quebec Nordiques || 6–4 || Flyers lead 1–0 || 
|- style="background:#cfc;"
| 2 || April 9 || Quebec Nordiques || 8–5 || Flyers lead 2–0 || 
|- style="background:#fcf;"
| 3 || April 11 || @ Quebec Nordiques || 0–2 || Flyers lead 2–1 || 
|- style="background:#fcf;"
| 4 || April 12 || @ Quebec Nordiques || 3–4  OT || Series tied 2–2 || 
|- style="background:#cfc;"
| 5 || April 14 || Quebec Nordiques || 5–2 || Flyers win 3–2 || 
|-

|- style="background:#cfc;"
| 1 || April 16 || Calgary Flames || 4–0 || Flyers lead 1–0 || 
|- style="background:#fcf;"
| 2 || April 17 || Calgary Flames || 4–5 || Series tied 1–1 || 
|- style="background:#fcf;"
| 3 || April 19 || @ Calgary Flames || 1–2 || Flames lead 2–1 || 
|- style="background:#fcf;"
| 4 || April 20 || @ Calgary Flames || 4–5 || Flames lead 3–1 || 
|- style="background:#cfc;"
| 5 || April 22 || Calgary Flames || 9–4 || Flames lead 3–2 || 
|- style="background:#cfc;"
| 6 || April 24 || @ Calgary Flames || 3–2 || Series tied 3–3 || 
|- style="background:#fcf;"
| 7 || April 26 || Calgary Flames || 1–4 || Flames win 4–3 || 
|-

|-
| Legend:

Player statistics

Scoring
 Position abbreviations: C = Center; D = Defense; G = Goaltender; LW = Left Wing; RW = Right Wing
  = Joined team via a transaction (e.g., trade, waivers, signing) during the season. Stats reflect time with the Flyers only.
  = Left team via a transaction (e.g., trade, waivers, release) during the season. Stats reflect time with the Flyers only.

Goaltending
  = Joined team via a transaction (e.g., trade, waivers, signing) during the season. Stats reflect time with the Flyers only.
  = Left team via a transaction (e.g., trade, waivers, release) during the season. Stats reflect time with the Flyers only.

Awards and records

Awards

Records

Among the team records set during the 1980–81 season was Bobby Clarke tying the team record for goals in a single period (3) on December 13. The team’s 2,621 penalty minutes during the regular season is a franchise record. During their preliminary round series against the Quebec Nordiques, the two shorthanded goals scored during game two tied a team record. Seven seconds into game four Terry Murray scored the fastest goal from the start of a playoff game in team history.

A number of team records were set or tied during game four of their quarterfinal series against the Calgary Flames, most notably setting a team record for most goals during a playoff game (9). Their five goals during the first period (5) is also tied for the team record. Ken Linseman tied team records for most assists in a playoff game (4) and period (3). Their 9–4 victory in the game ended a team record seven game playoff road losing streak dating back to May 17, 1980.

Milestones

Transactions
The Flyers were involved in the following transactions from May 25, 1980, the day after the deciding game of the 1980 Stanley Cup Finals, through May 21, 1981, the day of the deciding game of the 1981 Stanley Cup Finals.

Trades

Players acquired

Players lost

Signings

Draft picks

Philadelphia's picks at the 1980 NHL Entry Draft, which was held at the Montreal Forum in Montreal, Quebec, on June 11, 1980.

Farm teams
The Flyers were affiliated with the Maine Mariners of the AHL and the Toledo Goaldiggers of the IHL.

Notes

References
General
 
 
 
Specific

Philadelphia Flyers seasons
Philadelphia
Philadelphia
Philadelphia
Philadelphia